The Flapjack River is a tributary of the Mattawa Bay of the Southwest of Gouin Reservoir, flowing into the town of La Tuque, into the administrative area of the Mauricie, in Quebec, in Canada.

The Flapjack River flows successively into the townships of Buies, Provencher and Poisson. Forestry is the main economic activity of this valley; recreational tourism activities, second.

Forest Road R1009 intersects the lower Flapjack River watershed approximately one kilometre upstream of the mouth of the river. This road serves the western part of the Gouin Reservoir and connects to the Southeast to the R0404 Forest Road. Some secondary forest roads are in use nearby for forestry and recreational tourism activities.

The surface of the Flapjack River is usually frozen from mid-November to the end of April, however, safe ice movement is generally from early December to late March.

Geography

Toponymy 
The term flapjack refers to a cake of British origin, resembling an energy bar. The main ingredients are: oat flakes, butter, brown sugar and golden syrup.

The toponym "Flapjack River" was formalized on December 5, 1968 at the Commission de toponymie du Québec, when it was created.

Notes and references

See also 

Rivers of Mauricie
Tributaries of the Saint-Maurice River
La Tuque, Quebec